Robert John "Bob" Gaona (January 3, 1931 – May 23, 2001) was a professional American football player who played offense, defense, and special teams for three seasons for the Pittsburgh Steelers and the Philadelphia Eagles.

References

External links

1931 births
2001 deaths
American football offensive linemen
Pittsburgh Steelers players
Philadelphia Eagles players
Wake Forest Demon Deacons football players
People from Ambridge, Pennsylvania